The 1916 Southwestern Pirates football team represented Southwestern University as a member of the Southwest Conference (SWC) during the 1916 college football season. Led third-year head coach J. Burton Rix, Southwestern compiled an overall record of 3–5–1 with a mark of 0–4 in SWC play.

Schedule

References

Southwestern
Southwestern Pirates football seasons
Southwestern Pirates football